The Anglo-Saxon name Guthrum corresponds to Norwegian Guttom and to Danish Gorm. 

The name Guthrum may refer to these kings:

 Guthrum (died c. 890), later King Æthelstan, who fought against Alfred the Great
 Gorm the Old (died c. 958) of Denmark and Norway
 Guthrum II, a 10th-century king of dubious existence
 Guttorm of Norway (1199–1204), King of Norway